Chromosome 2q31.1 duplication syndrome is a protein that in humans is encoded by the DUP2Q31.1 gene.

References

Further reading